The NBC superhero serial drama series Heroes follows the lives of people across the globe who possess various superhuman powers as they struggle to cope with their everyday lives and prevent foreseen disasters from occurring. The fourth and final season premiered on September 21, 2009, and was released on DVD on July 27, 2010.

On May 14, 2010, NBC cancelled the show after four seasons, although it would return as a 13-episode miniseries in 2015.

Plot
New characters are introduced in this season, mostly centred around a carnival troupe and their leader.

Cast and characters

Main characters
Hayden Panettiere as Claire Bennet
Robert Knepper as Samuel Sullivan
Jack Coleman as Noah Bennet
Zachary Quinto as Sylar
Milo Ventimiglia as Peter Petrelli
Masi Oka as Hiro Nakamura 
Greg Grunberg as Matt Parkman
Cristine Rose as Angela Petrelli
Adrian Pasdar as Nathan Petrelli
James Kyson Lee as Ando Masahashi
Ali Larter as Tracy Strauss
Sendhil Ramamurthy as Mohinder Suresh

Recurring characters

Episodes

References

04
2009 American television seasons
2010 American television seasons